Michiel Patijn (born 19 August 1942) is a retired Dutch politician and diplomat of the People's Party for Freedom and Democracy (VVD).

Decorations

References

External links
Official
  Mr. M. (Michiel) Patijn Parlement & Politiek

 
 

1942 births
Living people
Dutch expatriates in Belgium
Dutch members of the Dutch Reformed Church
Dutch officials of the European Union
Knights of the Order of Orange-Nassau
Leiden University alumni
Members of the House of Representatives (Netherlands)
Politicians from The Hague
People's Party for Freedom and Democracy politicians
Permanent Representatives of the Netherlands to NATO
Protestant Church Christians from the Netherlands
State Secretaries for Foreign Affairs of the Netherlands
20th-century Dutch civil servants
20th-century Dutch diplomats
20th-century Dutch politicians
21st-century Dutch civil servants
21st-century Dutch diplomats
21st-century Dutch politicians